Mahendradatta (961—1011 CE), also known as Gunapriya Dharmapatni, was the queen of Bali, the queen consort of Udayana Warmadewa, also popularly known as King Udayana from Warmadewa dynasty. She was also the mother of Javanese hero-king Airlangga. Her other younger sons are Marakata (later become king of Bali after the death of Udayana) and Anak Wungçu (ascend to Balinese throne after the death of Marakata).

Early life
Gunapriyadharmapatni was born in 961 and growing up in Watugaluh palace, Eastern Java. She was a Javanese princess of Eastern Javanese Isyana Dynasty, the daughter of king Sri Makutawangsawarddhana of late Mataram Kingdom period. She was the sister of King Dharmawangsa of Mataram. She was later betrothed to Balinese king Udayana, and moved to the island as a queen consort and assumed the name Mahendradatta.

Marriage and reign
Her powerful position as the princess of ruling Mataram Kingdom has led the historian to suggests that actually Mahendradatta was the queen regnant in Bali. Her marriage to Mataram's vassal, the Balinese Warmadewa family was a political arrangement to seal Bali as part of Eastern Javanese Mataram realm. Her position as powerful foreign queen has led the Balinese court to carefully respect, revered or even fear her.

She conceived her first son, Airlangga, in her 30s, quite late of age for women in ancient Java and Bali. However, there is a speculation suggesting that Mahendradatta was probably already married prior to Udayana. Thus Airlangga was not the biological son of king Udayana, he was conceived from her previous union to an unknown man, that after her separation (either because of death or divorce) she was later betrothed to the Balinese king, and she took the baby Airlangga to Bali. Historical sources seems to be silenced on Mahendradatta's suspected earlier marriage, that it might be a scandal or not even took place. This suspicion was because although Airlangga was the eldest son of Mahendradatta, curiously he was not chosen as the crown prince of Bali, his younger brother Marakata and later Anak Wungçu rose to Balinese throne instead. Moreover, Mahendradatta sent Airlangga back to Java during his teenage. Mahendradatta was known to be promoting the cult of Durga in Bali, and curiously later associated with Balinese legend of evil witch Rangda, which translates to "widow".

The Balinese folklore more or less mentioning the life story of Mahendradatta that linked with Balinese mythology of Rangda. The story goes that the queen was condemned and exiled by the king for allegedly practicing witchcraft and black magic. After she became a widow, hurt and humiliated, she sought revenge upon her ex-husband's court and the whole of his kingdom. She proceeded to take her revenge by killing off half the kingdom with plague before being overcome by a holy man. Her seemingly bad image in Balinese folklore was probably reflected her actual life that her marriage run bad, or motivated by Balinese court politics to discredit the ruling foreign Javanese queen. Her marriage probably was not a smooth one, that the queen was up against the court of Balinese Warmadewa and her own husband.

Religious adherent 
Mahendradatta is known for her devotion to Durga. She was believed to bring the cult of Durga to Bali from Java. Although Durga is known as consort of Shiva, in ancient Javanese and Balinese traditions, Durga is depicted of having fierce nature, in contrast to another shakti; the benevolent Vishnu's consort Lakshmi. The cult of Durga is traditionally linked with sacrifice, black magic and witchcraft. This led to the unpopular depiction of her, that later associated with Rangda, the evil witch in Balinese mythology.

After her death in 1011 CE, she was deified and depicted as Durga Mahisashuramardini (Durga as the slayer of Bull-demon), entombed in the temple within Pura Bukit Dharma Kutri, located in Buruan village, Blahbatu, Gianyar Regency, Bali. Within this Balinese temple compound, exist several Hindu-Buddhist statues dated from around 10th to 13th century. Those include, but not limited to the depictions of Amoghapasa, Ganesha, Bhatara, Durga  Mahisasuramardhini, and Buddha.

Notes

References
 Willard A. Hanna (2004). Bali Chronicles. Periplus, Singapore. .

961 births
1011 deaths
History of Bali
Monarchs of Bali
10th-century Indonesian women
11th-century women rulers
Deified people
11th-century Indonesian women